Jean-Baptiste Solignac (15 March 1773 in Millau – 11 November 1850 in Montpellier) was a French general, and the brother-in-law of Marshal Jean-Baptiste Jourdan. He took part in the French Revolutionary, Napoleonic, and Portuguese Civil Wars.

Career
On 28 September 1791, he was a soldier in the Vermandois regiment (which later became the 61st infantry regiment). He became a lieutenant then a captain in August and November 1792, in the 2nd Pyrénées-Orientales battalion, formed at Montpellier. He fought in the early campaigns of the French Revolutionary War in the armée des Pyrénées orientales and the Peninsular War where he was wounded fighting at the Battle of Vimeiro.

References

Sources

 
 https://www.dukeofwellington.org/post/the-battle-of-vimeiro-21-august-1808

People from Millau
1773 births
1850 deaths
Field marshals of Portugal
Military personnel of the Liberal Wars
French Republican military leaders of the French Revolutionary Wars
French commanders of the Napoleonic Wars
Names inscribed under the Arc de Triomphe